Sara Ryan (born 1971) is an American writer and librarian living in Portland, Oregon.

Biography
Ryan was raised in Ann Arbor, Michigan, where she graduated from Pioneer High School in 1989. Her first novel, Empress of the World, was published in 2001 and is an ALA Best Book for Young Adults. A sequel, The Rules for Hearts, was published in 2007 and won the 2008 Oregon Book Award for Young Adult Literature. She also writes graphic novels and is a member of the Periscope Studio. Together with Carla Speed McNeil, she released Bad Houses in 2013 from Dark Horse Comics.

Ryan is a member of the faculty at the Vermont College of Fine Arts.

Openly bisexual, she is married to the cartoonist Steve Lieber.

Bibliography

Novels
 Empress of the World (2001)
 The Rules for Hearts (2007)

Graphic novels and sequential art
 Me and Edith Head (art: Steve Lieber) in Cicada v.4 no. 1 (Carus Publishing), 2002
 Nominated for a 2002 Eisner Award for Best Short Story
 reprinted as a standalone, self-published volume, 2002
 "Family Story" (art: Steve Lieber and Jeff Parker) in Hellboy: Weird Tales #3, 2003
 Collected in Hellboy: Weird Tales 1 (Dark Horse), 2003
 Flytrap (series)
 Flytrap – Episode One: Juggling Act (art: Steve Lieber), 2005
 Flytrap – Episode Two: Deep, too (art: Ron Chan), 2007
 Flytrap – Episode Three: Over the Wall (art: Ron Chan), 2007
 Flytrap – Episode Four: Performance Anxiety (art: Sarah Burrini), 2009
 Click (art: Dylan Meconis), 2007
 Einbahnstrasse Waltz (art: Cat Ellis), 2007
  Bad Houses (art: Carla Speed McNeil), 2013

References

External links
 Personal site
 

1971 births
21st-century American novelists
21st-century American women writers
American children's writers
American women novelists
LGBT comics creators
Living people
Writers from Ann Arbor, Michigan
Female comics writers
Novelists from Oregon
American librarians
American women librarians
Bisexual women
American LGBT novelists
LGBT people from Michigan
American women children's writers
Women science fiction and fantasy writers
Novelists from Michigan
Bisexual academics
American bisexual writers